Saser may refer to:

 a nickname for one of the best schools in Malaysia, Sekolah Menengah Sains Tuanku Munawir
 the Saser Muztagh range of the Karakoram
Saser Kangri, the highest peak of the range
  Sasser Pass (also Saser Pass, Saser-la), on the old caravan route between Ladakh and Yarkand
 an acronym for Sound Amplification by Stimulated Emission of Radiation. The word is analogous to maser and laser